MQM Founding Day is a political festival observed by Muhajirs to celebrate the founding of the first Muhajir nationalist party Muttahida Qaumi Movement, architect of Mohajir nation and Mohajir identity.

History

2012 
On 28th MQM founding day, Altaf Hussain announced the expansion of KKF, the welfare wing of the MQM, operations in Hyderabad. He said that funeral buses and ambulances worth Rs. 25.3 million were being added to the existing KKF system in Hyderabad.

2013 
29th MQM founding day was dedicated to womens rights by Altaf Hussain.

2016 
All roads leading to Karachi’s Jinnah Ground were packed with MQM workers and supporters who were shouting slogans in favour of their leader. A large number of women also attended the meeting.

2017 
On 33rd MQM founding day there was little reason to celebrate as the Urdu-speaking constituents in Karachi were at risk of being under-represented in the ongoing census.

2022 
Speaking to a workers’ convention held to mark the party’s 38th foundation day, MQM-P convenor Dr Khalid Maqbool Siddiqi said the heirs of those who struggled for creation of Pakistan were still struggling for their identity in this country. Altaf Hussain-led MQM, commonly known as MQM-London, organised the party’s foundation day events in the United Kingdom and other countries.

References

External Links 

Muttahida Qaumi Movement
Muhajir culture
Muhajir politics